Sana Ngayong Pasko (International title: A Christmas Hope / ) is a Philippine television drama series broadcast by GMA Network. Directed by Mike Tuviera, it stars Susan Roces. It premiered on December 7, 2009 on the network's Telebabad line up. The series concluded on January 8, 2010 with a total of 25 episodes. It was replaced by The Last Prince in its timeslot.

Cast and characters

Lead cast
 Susan Roces as Remedios Dionisio

Supporting cast
 Christopher de Leon as Gordon Dionisio
 Gina Alajar as Felicidad "Fely" Dionisio
 TJ Trinidad as Stephen Dionisio
 Dante Rivero as Pablo Dionisio
 Eddie Gutierrez as Ernesto Dionisio
 Ces Quesada as Narcisa
 JC de Vera as Rigo Dionisio
 Maxene Magalona as Irene Dionisio
 JC Tiuseco as Bernie
 Ynna Asistio as Happy
 Jacob Rica as Jopet Dionisio
 Francine Prieto as Aisha Dionisio

Guest cast
 Carmina Villaroel as young Remedios
 Zoren Legaspi as young Ernesto
 Jomari Yllana as young Pablo
 Renz Valerio as young Gordon
 Sandy Talag as young Fely
 Dion Ignacio as Julius
 Pen Medina as a priest
 John Arcilla as King 
 Ian Veneracion as Emmanuel
 Arnell Ignacio as Wanda
 Biboy Ramirez as Dannyboy
 Janine Desiderio as Divine
 Geoff Taylor as teen Jopet
 Frencheska Farr as Elivra 
 Yassi Pressman as Valeria

Ratings
According to AGB Nielsen Philippines' Mega Manila household television ratings, the pilot episode of Sana Ngayong Pasko earned a 22.2% rating. While the final episode scored a 25.3% rating.

Accolades

References

External links
 

2009 Philippine television series debuts
2010 Philippine television series endings
Christmas television series
Filipino-language television shows
GMA Network drama series
Television shows set in the Philippines